Pierre-Ludovic Duclos and Artem Sitak were the defending champions, but decided not to participate.

2nd seeds Sanchai and Sonchat Ratiwatana won this tournament. They defeated unseeded Harri Heliövaara and Michael Ryderstedt in the final.

Seeds

Draw

Draw

References
 Main Draw

Beijing International Challenger - Doubles
2011 Men's Doubles